Lucas van Tetrode, or Tetterode (c.1592 – 1647), was a Dutch Golden Age member of the Haarlem schutterij.

Biography
He is only known from his portrait painted by Frans Hals in his schutterstuk called The Officers of the St George Militia Company in 1639. The portrait is possibly not of him but of someone called "Francijn".

He is portrayed as a sergeant of the blue brigade, because he is wearing a blue sash and holding a sergeant's halberd.

References

Lucas van Tetrode in De Haarlemse Schuttersstukken, by Jhr. Mr. C.C. van Valkenburg, pp. 71, Haerlem : jaarboek 1961, ISSN 0927-0728, on the website of the North Holland Archives

1592 births
1647 deaths
Frans Hals
People from Haarlem